Bekmünde is a municipality in the district of Steinburg, in Schleswig-Holstein, Germany. It is around 5 km west of Itzehoe and around 50 km northwest of Hamburg.

References

Municipalities in Schleswig-Holstein
Steinburg